Shakudō (赤銅) is a Japanese billon of gold and copper (typically 4–10% gold, 96–90% copper), one of the irogane class of colored metals, which can be treated to develop a black, or sometimes indigo, patina, resembling lacquer. Unpatinated shakudō visually resembles bronze; the dark color is induced by the niiro artificial patination process, involving boiling in a solution, generally including rokushō.

Naming
The characters in the name shaku-dō mean "red" and "copper" but combined they represent this material which begins with a darkened coppery-bronze color and is then modified to black or near-black.

History

Early uses
The word "shakudō" first appears in records of the Japanese "Nara" period (710-784 AD), but it is not clear to what it referred (it could have been some form of copper, or a form of the now-known material).  There are actual pieces known from the 12th century onwards.  Shakudō was historically used to construct or decorate Japanese sword ("nihonto") fittings such as tsuba, menuki, and kozuka, as well as other small ornaments, sliding door catches, and small boxes.

Introduction to the West
Shakudō was introduced to the West in the mid-19th century.

Possible origins
Materials like shakudo were historically thought to be specific to the Chinese and Japanese, and perhaps other Asian, milieu, but recent studies have noted close similarities to certain decorative alloys used in ancient Egypt, Greece, and Rome.

Production
The origins of shakudo date back to a period when Japan was still importing significant techniques and materials from Korea and China, but accounts of production all derive from much later, and little is known of their evolution.  By the Meiji period, the initial production process entailed the heating of copper, addition of fine gold, and some addition of shirome, a by-product of copper production containing iron, arsenic and other elements.  In the Edo period, it appears that the process may have used nigurome rather than copper; nigurome being itself a pre-made mix of copper and shirome.  The resulting alloy was then allowed to rest in ingot moulds in heated water, before being shaped, and annealed at around 650° C.  In cooled form, the metal was then surface-finished using the niiro process.  The modern process tends to omit the shirome, working with copper and gold, and other additives directly if needed.

Use
Due to the expensive gold content, shakudō was normally limited to accents or small items such as tsuba. Larger historical objects (such as vases) that are described as shakudō may be mislabeled, especially if the glossy blue-black color is not evident. Unpatinated or repolished shakudō will not spontaneously patinate in air.

Modern artisans have revived the use of shakudō as a striking design element, in the making of jewelry, vessels, and for the technique of mokume-gane.

Shakudō is sometimes inaccurately used as a general term for damascened decorative metal inlays of Japanese origin. These were widely known in the West as Amita damascene, from the name of a 20th-century manufacturer of such items for export. Amita damascene included shakudo, shibuichi, gold, silver, and bronze for inlays.

See also

Further reading

External links

Oguchi, Hachiro. Japanese Shakudo: Its History, Properties and Production from Gold-Containing Alloys. Gold Bulletin, 16, 4, 1983, pp. 125–132 
National Pollutant Inventory – Copper and compounds fact sheet
History of the Amita Damascene Company

Irogane
Copper alloys
Precious metal alloys